The Code is a 2002 French action film directed by Manuel Boursinhac.

Cast 
 Samuel Le Bihan - Dris
 Samy Naceri - Yanis
 Clotilde Courau - Nina
 Marie Guillard - Lise
 Michel Duchaussoy - Fèche
 Philippe Nahon - Simon
 Francis Renaud - Niglo
 Lucien Jean-Baptiste - Foued
  - Rouquin
 Stéphane Ferrara - Prosper
 Édith Scob - Mireille
 Élisabeth Margoni - Evelyne
 Samir Guesmi - Daniel
 François Berléand - The man in contract with Yanis (uncredited)

References

External links 

2002 action films
2002 films
French action films
2000s French films